Sargent County is a county in the U.S. state of North Dakota. Its county seat is Forman, and its most populous city is Gwinner. The county is named in honor of Homer E. Sargent, a 19th-century general manager of the Northern Pacific Railroad Company. The county spans an agricultural region between the James River and Red River valleys in southeastern North Dakota dotted with various sloughs, lakes, and hills.

As of the 2020 census, the population was 3,862. It is the 29th-most populous county in North Dakota, and was the original home of the Bobcat Company, a manufacturer of farm and construction equipment that still produces a large number of skid-steer loaders at its facility in Gwinner.

History
The Dakota Territory created the county on April 9, 1883, with areas partitioned from Ransom County, from previously unorganized areas and from non-county areas in the Wahpeton and Sisseton Indian Reserve. It was named for H. E. Sargent, a railroad executive. Its governing structure was not completed at that time, so it was attached to Richland for judicial purposes and to Ransom for administrative purposes. This arrangement only lasted until October 8, when the county government was effected, with Milnor as the county seat. However, in 1884, in the county's first election, Forman was chosen as the county seat.

The Northern Pacific Railway laid a line into the county in 1883, reaching Milnor. By 1900 it had been extended across the county. The county's population rapidly increased, reaching a peak in the 1920 United States census (9,655).

In 1997 the Brampton Lutheran Church (originally built in 1908) was moved to Sletta near Radøy in Norway and reconstructed there. It is now called Emigrantkirka (Emigrant Church).

The Sargent County Courthouse, a Beaux Arts-style building built in 1910, is listed on the U.S. National Register of Historic Places.

Geography

Sargent County lies near the southeastern corner of North Dakota, abutting the state's southern border with South Dakota. The county is almost exactly rectangular in shape (consisting of 24 sections of land), with a small protrusion in the county's southeastern corner for alignment with the boundaries of the Lake Traverse Indian Reservation.

Other than small portions of the western and northern sides of the county that lie in the James River and Sheyenne River watersheds, respectively, the vast majority of the county lies within the watershed of the Wild Rice River, whose source is the termination of a drainage ditch about two miles northeast of Brampton in southwestern Sargent County. It flows generally easterly through the southern part of the county, passing through Silver Lake and Lake Tewaukon before flowing further east into Richland County about five miles southeast of De Lamere.

The county's topography is varied, with the southern and western portions of the county being dominated by glacial hills, including the northern tip of the Coteau des Prairies standing prominently along the county's southern border, gradually transitioning into the much flatter landscape of the Red River Valley in the eastern portion of the county. The flatter areas of the county are largely devoted to the production of corn, soybean, and wheat, with much of the more hilly terrain being used as pastures for grazing livestock. The terrain generally slopes to the south and east, with its highest point on its western boundary line at 1,365' (416m) ASL, although a northwest–southeast rise on the eastern portion of its south boundary line rises to 1,729' (527m) ASL.

Sargent County is located within the Prairie Pothole Region of the northern Great Plains, and as such has a landscape that is covered in numerous wetlands. The majority of these wetlands are shallow sloughs that vary in size in wetter and drier years, but there are also a number of larger and deeper lakes. Lake Tewaukon, located within Tewaukon National Wildlife Refuge in the southeastern portion of the county, is one of the county's largest lakes. Meanwhile, the western end of the county contains a chain of lakes, the largest of which is Kraft Lake. Many of the county's lakes are populated with fish such as yellow perch and walleye, making fishing (including ice fishing in the winter months) a popular recreation for both locals and visitors to the county.

Adjacent counties

 Ransom County to the north
 Richland County to the east
 Roberts County, South Dakota to the southeast
 Marshall County, South Dakota to the south
 Brown County, South Dakota to the southwest
 Dickey County to the west

National protected areas
 Storm Lake National Wildlife Refuge
 Tewaukon National Wildlife Refuge
 Wild Rice Lake National Wildlife Refuge

Lakes

 Alkali Lake
 Borg Lake
 Buffalo Lake
 Clouds Lake
 Golden Hill Lake
 Kraft Lake
 Lake Dell
 Lake Fedge
 Lake Tewaukon
 Pickell Lake
 Silver Lake
 Sprague Lake
 Storm Lake
 White Lake

Demographics

2000 census
As of the 2000 census, there were 4,366 people, 1,786 households and 1,243 families in the county. The population density was 5.08/sqmi (1.96/km2). There were 2,016 housing units at an average density of 2.35/sqmi (0.91/km2). The racial makeup of the county was 98.24% White, 0.05% Black or African American, 0.46% Native American, 0.05% Asian, 0.55% from other races, and 0.66% from two or more races. 0.73% of the population were Hispanic or Latino of any race. 37.5% were of German and 35.4% Norwegian ancestry.

There were 1,786 households, out of which 30.30% had children under the age of 18 living with them, 61.00% were married couples living together, 3.90% had a female householder with no husband present, and 30.40% were non-families. 27.70% of all households were made up of individuals, and 14.10% had someone living alone who was 65 years of age or older. The average household size was 2.43 and the average family size was 2.99.

The county population contained 26.50% under the age of 18, 5.30% from 18 to 24, 25.70% from 25 to 44, 25.70% from 45 to 64, and 16.90% who were 65 years of age or older. The median age was 40 years. For every 100 females there were 110.60 males. For every 100 females age 18 and over, there were 110.10 males.

The median income for a household in the county was $37,213, and the median income for a family was $44,063. Males had a median income of $34,222 versus $19,844 for females. The per capita income for the county was $18,689. About 6.00% of families and 8.20% of the population were below the poverty line, including 8.90% of those under age 18 and 11.80% of those age 65 or over.

2010 census
As of the 2010 census, there were 3,829 people, 1,675 households and 1,113 families in the county. The population density was 4.46/sqmi (1.72/km2). There were 2,004 housing units at an average density of 2.33/sqmi (0.90/km2). The racial makeup of the county was 98.0% white, 0.5% American Indian, 0.2% Asian, 0.1% Pacific islander, 0.1% black or African American, 0.3% from other races, and 0.7% from two or more races. Those of Hispanic or Latino origin made up 1.3% of the population. In terms of ancestry, 51.3% were German, 35.9% were Norwegian, 11.8% were Swedish, 8.4% were Irish, and 3.0% were American.

Of the 1,675 households, 27.1% had children under the age of 18 living with them, 57.3% were married couples living together, 4.7% had a female householder with no husband present, 33.6% were non-families, and 30.2% of all households were made up of individuals. The average household size was 2.26 and the average family size was 2.79. The median age was 45.9 years.

The median income for a household in the county was $49,318 and the median income for a family was $59,531. Males had a median income of $43,594 versus $30,152 for females. The per capita income for the county was $26,553. About 5.7% of families and 7.8% of the population were below the poverty line, including 10.5% of those under age 18 and 10.4% of those age 65 or over.

Law and government

Commissioners

Sargent County is governed by an elected and nonpartisan board of commissioners, each of which is elected at-large.

Transportation

Major highways
  North Dakota Highway 11
  North Dakota Highway 13
  North Dakota Highway 32

Communities

Cities

 Cayuga
 Cogswell
 Forman (county seat)
 Gwinner
 Havana
 Milnor
 Rutland

Census-designated place
 De Lamere

Unincorporated communities

 Cogswell
 Crete
 Stirum
 Straubville

Townships

 Bowen
 Brampton
 Denver
 Dunbar
 Forman
 Hall
 Harlem
 Herman
 Jackson
 Kingston
 Marboe
 Milnor
 Ransom
 Rutland
 Sargent
 Shuman
 Southwest
 Taylor
 Tewaukon
 Verner
 Vivian
 Weber
 Whitestone Hill
 Willey

Politics
Sargent County is a swing county in presidential elections, having voted for both parties an equal number of times since 1980. From 1948 on, it has backed the national winner in every presidential election except for 1988, when a majority of the county's votes went to Democrat Michael Dukakis, and 2020, when a majority of the county's residents voted for Republican Donald Trump in his bid for reelection.

See also
 National Register of Historic Places listings in Sargent County, North Dakota

References

External links
 Sargent County map, North Dakota DOT

 
1883 establishments in Dakota Territory
Populated places established in 1883